Wurt Pit and Devil's Punchbowl is a 0.2 hectare (0.5 acre) geological Site of Special Scientific Interest between East Harptree and the Priddy Circles in the Mendip Hills, Somerset, notified in 1987.

Natural England describes the site as:

Wade and Wade, in their 1929 book Somerset, described the Devil's Punch Bowl as one of the most notable Swallet Holes on the Mendips

References

External links 
Wurt Pit and Devil's Punchbowl at GCR database

Mendip Hills
Sites of Special Scientific Interest in Somerset
Sites of Special Scientific Interest notified in 1987
Geology of Somerset